Ğälimcan İbrahimov (1887–1938) was a Tatar public figure, writer and linguist. The Institute of Language, Literature and Art of the Tatarstan Academy of Sciences is named after him.

Biography 
Ğälimcan İbrahimov was born in 1887 in  the village of Sultanmuratovo in the family of Ğirfan İbrahimov, who was an imam in this village, and his wife, Bibixäsänä. He  received his primary education from his father, then he studied in the madrasah  of Keşänle, and in the Russian-language zemstvo school in  Soltanmorat. In 1898–1905 and 1906–1908 he studied at "Wäliä"  (Orendurg) and "Ğäliä" (Ufa) madrasahs respectively. After  İbrahimof was expelled from "Ğäliä", he collaborated with various  Tatar-language newspapers, such as Älislax, Yoldız, Waqıt,  Añ, worked as a teacher in modern-day Qazaqstan, Ural, and vicinities of  Ästerxan.  In 1912–1913 İbrahimov attended Kiev University as a free listener but  was arrested by the police for participating in the underground Muslim  revolutionary circle and remained under surveilliance until February  Revolution. Upon  release from prison, he worked as an executive secretary of Añ journal (Qazan);  then, in 1915 İbrahimov began to work as a teacher in Ğäliä madrasah.

After the February Revolution İbrahimov,  together with Fatix Säyfi-Qazanlı and Şärif Sünçäläy began to publish a  newspaper called İrek (Freedom); the same year he was elected to Millät Mäclese, where he was a member of Tupraqçılar (supporters of  territorial autonomy) faction and participated in the activities of its  legislative and financial commissions. He  was also elected a deputy of the Russian Constituent Assembly from Ufa Governorate. In 1918 together with Mullanur Waxitof and Şärif Manatof  participated in the creation of the Commissariat for Muslim Affairs of Inner Russia under the RSFSR's People's Commissariat for Nationalities.  In 1919–1920 İbrahimov was a member of the Central Muslim Military Collegium,  head of the Press Department Editorial Board of the Central Bureau of  Communist Organizations of the Peoples of the East under the Central Committee of the RCP(b), and an employee of the Qızıl Şäreq (Red East)  magazine.

From 1920, he worked at the People's  Commissariat of Education of Tatarstan ASSR, and was the chief editor of Bezneñ yul (Our  way) and Mäğärif  (Education) journals. In 1925–1927, İbrahimof was a head  of Academic Center of the People's Commissariat of the Republic Education of Tatar ASSR.

He retired in 1927 due to illness in  1927, and lived in Yalta (Crimea) until 1937, when he  was arrested as a part of falsified case of right-wing Trotskyite  anti-soviet nationalist organization. İbrahimof was transferred to Qazan's  Pelätän prison and died shortly after in its hospital of pulmonary tuberculosis and tuberculous pleurisy. He was posthumously rehabilitated in 1955

The Institute of Language, Literature and Art of the Tatarstan Academy of Sciences is named after him. There is a museum dedicated to the writer in his home village.

Works 
İbrahimof's first literary  work, was published in Älislax newspaper in 1907. Other works indclude  (Young hearts, 1912),  (Our days, 1919),  (Kazakh girl, 1924),  (Deep roots, 1928) novels,  (Tatar woman's fate, 1910),  (Red flowers, 1921),  (People, 1923, dedicated to events related to the famine in the Volga area) stories,  (New people, 1920) play, etc. His collected works were published in 1974–1987 and in 2000 in Qazan.

Also, Ibrahimof wrote articles about Şihabetdin Märcani, Qäyüm Nasıyri, and historical and publicistic works on revolutionary movement among Tatars.

References

External links
 

Muslims from the Russian Empire
1881 births
1950 deaths
Tatar revolutionaries
Great Purge victims from Russia
Soviet rehabilitations
1887 births
1938 deaths